The following is a List of Global Schools Foundation schools. The Global Schools Foundation (GSF) is a Singapore headquartered chain of schools. It is the administrative authority for all its institutions in Singapore and abroad. The schools are accredited by the Central Board of Secondary Education (CBSE), Indian Certificate of Secondary Education (ICSE), International General Certificate of Secondary Education (IGCSE), and International Baccalaureate (IB).

List of Global Schools Foundation's schools

Global Indian International Schools 

 Singapore
 Abu Dhabi
 Ahmedabad
 Dubai
 Pune
 Noida
 Tokyo

One World International Schools 

 Singapore
 Riyadh
 Abu Dhabi

Dwight Schools 

 Seoul

Regent International Schools 

 Kuala Lumpur
 Kedah
 Pahang
 Selangor

Harrods International Academy 

 Phnom Penh (3 campuses)

Renford International School 

 Phnom Penh

Historical schools 

 Nottingham High School

Partner schools 

 Domuschola International School, Manila

References 

Lists of schools in India
Educational organisations based in Singapore
High schools and secondary schools in Asia